Borneotheopea is a genus of leaf beetles in the family Chrysomelidae. There are at least two described species in Borneotheopea, both found in Borneo. It is closely related to the genus Theopea.

Species
These two species belong to the genus Borneotheopea:
 Borneotheopea jakli Lee & Bezděk, 2020
 Borneotheopea kalimantanensis Lee & Bezděk, 2020

References

Galerucinae
Chrysomelidae genera
Beetles of Asia